Shead High School is a public high school in Eastport, Maine. The original Shead Memorial High School was dedicated in 1918 and that building lasted until 1980, when it was destroyed and the new building was completed. Shead was named to the 2009 "America's Best High Schools" list by U.S. News & World Report.

Athletics 
Shead High School offers Baseball, Basketball, Cross Country, Golf, Soccer, Softball, and Tennis.

References

Educational institutions established in 1918
Schools in Washington County, Maine
Eastport, Maine
1918 establishments in Maine